The Manacled Mormon case, also known as the Mormon sex in chains case, was a case of reputed sexual assault and kidnap by an American woman, Joyce McKinney, of a young American Mormon missionary, Kirk Anderson, in England in 1977. Because McKinney and her accomplice skipped bail and fled to the United States before the case could be tried and were not extradited, they were never tried for these specific crimes. According to Anderson, he had been abducted by McKinney from the steps of a church meetinghouse, chained to a bed and raped by her.

After the case, McKinney absconded from the United Kingdom and was allowed to reside in the United States with a falsified passport. In 2008 it was learned that she made five clones of her pet pit bull in South Korea, and was subsequently charged with plotting to have a teenager break into a house to raise funds for a prosthetic leg for her horse. In 2016, she sued film director Errol Morris for making a documentary about her.

Alleged crime
A young Mormon missionary, Kirk Anderson, went missing on 14 September 1977, in Ewell, Surrey. He was allegedly abducted from the steps of a meetinghouse of the Church of Jesus Christ of Latter-day Saints by Keith May, 24, who had posed as an investigator into Mormonism, using a fake handgun and chloroform. Three days later, a freed Anderson made a report to the police that he had been abducted, driven to Devon, and imprisoned against his will, chained to a bed in a cottage, where Joyce Bernann McKinney (a Miss World USA 1973 participant; born 6 August 1949 as Joy McKinney) had attempted to seduce and then raped him.

Police set up a sting operation by having Anderson set up a 21 September rendezvous with McKinney and May leading to the two suspects being arrested.

Judicial proceedings
On 19 September 1977, McKinney and her alleged conspirator Keith May were arrested and charged with kidnap and assault. They vigorously denied the charges. While being taken to Epsom for a court appearance, she held a notice up at the window of the police vehicle saying, "Kirk left with me willingly!" At the committal hearing, McKinney stated of Anderson: "I loved him so much that I would ski naked down Mount Everest in the nude with a carnation up my nose if he asked me to." Under the Sexual Offences Act 1956 then in force in the United Kingdom, because the victim was male, no crime of rape had been committed, though indecent assault of a man did apply.

McKinney and May jumped bail and absconded from the UK on 12 April 1978. Their trial for kidnap had been due to begin on 2 May. A judge at London's Central Criminal Court in June 1978 sentenced McKinney and May in absentia to a year in prison for skipping bail (if their bail money, £1,000 each, was not paid to the court in forfeit). No extradition proceedings were instituted by Britain.

On 18 July 1979, May and McKinney were both arrested in the United States by the FBI on charges of making false statements in order to obtain passports. They both received suspended sentences.

Coverage in the media
The coverage in British newspapers in the final months of 1977 was extensive. Some newspapers sought to obtain "scoops" on the story, and to undermine each other as they managed to obtain and publish exclusive information. For example, the Daily Mirror researched McKinney's past and reported over several days that she had been a nude model. The Daily Mail attempted to devalue the Mirrors reports by advertising itself as "The paper without Joyce McKinney".

Brian Whitaker has observed that the case provided "light relief" for the newspaper-reading public, from more serious stories about politicians. Roger Wilkes states that the coverage of the case "cheered Britain up no end".

A Church of Scotland working party on obscenity in 1979 observed the "gusto" with which newspapers covered and followed the case observing the coverage was accompanied by "the kind of illustration which a decade ago would have been under plain sealed cover".

The coverage was extensive in part because the case was considered so anomalous, involving as it did the issue of rape of a man by a woman. Backhouse and Cohen reported in 1978 that many men, privately, expressed their disbelief of such a possibility.

The case was documented in Joyce McKinney and the Manacled Mormon, a book by Anthony Delano in 1978, who based his work on assembled Daily Mirror coverage.

Later developments
In 1984 McKinney was again the subject of police action for allegedly stalking Anderson, though he was now married with children. At the time of her apprehension, McKinney was found living in her vehicle near Salt Lake International Airport, where Anderson worked. A search of the vehicle uncovered road maps, rope, handcuffs, and notebooks keeping detailed records of Anderson's routines. McKinney insisted that she had driven to the airport to book a flight, though it was later revealed that she had driven several thousand miles from her home in North Carolina.

In 2008, a story about a woman named "Bernann McKinney" appeared in the media after the woman had her pet dog cloned in South Korea. Journalists tied the two incidents together in articles identifying facial similarity between "Bernann McKinney" and Joyce Bernann McKinney. After initial denials the International Herald Tribune and other publications carried an admission by McKinney that she was the person named in the 1977 case.

It was subsequently reported that McKinney had been accused of telling a 15-year old boy to break into a house in Tennessee so that she could buy a prosthetic leg for her horse. The events allegedly took place in 2004. She was charged with criminal conspiracy to commit aggravated burglary and contributing to the delinquency of a minor, but again jumped bail.

The revival of interest in the story led the documentary filmmaker Errol Morris to produce a 2010 film, Tabloid, based on the media sensation surrounding the story. The film gives extra details, from press reports of the day and from participants in the story, to the use of a (possibly fake) gun during Anderson's abduction, and Anderson being tied up during his alleged rape by McKinney. The film also gave further details regarding McKinney's work as a call girl, earning funds for her team's international adventure by offering bondage and S&M services around the time she became obsessed with Anderson.

In January 2016, McKinney filed suit against Morris, claiming that she had been misrepresented in the film and that Morris and others related to the documentary's production had broken into her home, stolen personal items related to the case, and threatened the life of her service dog if McKinney did not sign release papers allowing them to use her footage for the film. Legal representatives for Morris stated that "evidence will show that [McKinney] willingly – in fact, eagerly – participated in the lengthy interview that is featured in the film." Morris stated in an interview later that year that the charges had been dismissed as "frivolous".

Anderson  was a real estate agent and shied away from publicity. Keith May, McKinney's co-conspirator from the 1977 case, died in 2004. At one point, McKinney lived in Newland, in the western North Carolina mountains. More recently, she has lived as a homeless person in the San Fernando Valley region of Los Angeles.

Vehicular manslaughter charge
In July 2019, the Los Angeles Police Department's Valley Traffic Division (VTD) named McKinney as the person involved in a fatal hit and run that took the life of 91-year-old Gennady Bolotsky. The incident took place in the North Hollywood neighborhood of Valley Village on Monday, 16 June 2019, at around 5:40 a.m. Bolotsky was walking his dog at a crosswalk on Magnolia Boulevard and Wilkinson Avenue when he was struck by a white 2006 GMC pick-up truck. The incident was captured by surveillance video from a nearby business. Stills from this video were released by police, and locals identified the vehicle as belonging to a then-unidentified homeless woman who had been the subject of frequent police reports. On 21 June 2019, investigators followed a lead that the suspected vehicle was parked in the city of Burbank near the Burbank Airport. Investigators located McKinney, who appeared to be living in the vehicle along with her three dogs.

During the investigation, detectives learned that McKinney had outstanding warrants for battery and public nuisance from an unrelated investigation. McKinney was taken into custody for her preexisting warrants and booked into Valley Jail Division in Van Nuys. McKinney's vehicle was impounded by VTD investigators and processed for evidence related to the fatal collision. On 1 July 2019, the VTD presented their case to the Los Angeles County District Attorney and charged McKinney with assault with a deadly weapon other than a firearm, hit and run with injury and vehicular manslaughter. A sentencing enhancement was proposed due to injury to a person over 70 years of age. McKinney remained in custody on the previous warrants, under a combined bail of $137,500. If convicted, she faces up to a maximum of 11 years in state prison. McKinney was ordered to a psychiatric evaluation and, on 11 July 2019, she was sent to the Los Angeles Court division for mentally incompetent defendants. McKinney was taken to the Metropolitan State Hospital in Norwalk. In February 2020, a judge in Van Nuys ruled once again she was not competent. Her next hearing was scheduled for August 2020.

References

Bibliography

 
 
 
 
 
 
 
 
 
 
 
 
 
 
 
 

1970s in Devon
1970s in Surrey
1977 crimes in the United Kingdom
1977 in Christianity
1977 in England
20th-century Mormon missionaries
20th-century Mormonism
Crime in Devon
Crime in Surrey
Epsom and Ewell
History of women in the United Kingdom
Kidnappings in England
Mormon missionaries in England
Rape in England
Rape of males
Scandals in England
Sex scandals
The Church of Jesus Christ of Latter-day Saints in England
Violence against men in the United Kingdom